is a Japanese manga series written by Gō Zappa and illustrated by Sakura Takeuchi. It is published by Hakusensha in the magazine Young Animal and collected in 8 tankōbon volumes. The series has been adapted into a 24-episode anime television series by Nomad, airing in 2006 and released on 8 DVDs. It is also known as Chokotto Sister and Chocosis.

Plot
The story centers around a Christmas wish made by a young Haruma Kawagoe, who was eagerly anticipating having a baby sister, after his mother suffered a miscarriage followed by a hysterectomy. Several years later, when Haruma is a college student, a woman on a flying motorbike claiming to be Santa Claus delivers his wish, a younger sister. When he remarks that he made his wish a long time ago, "Santa" replies that making a little sister takes a lot more time than just making an android, takes his signature for delivery, and departs. Haruma now has a little sister, who comes with her own instruction manual — a manual for how to be a little sister, that is.

Characters
 
 
 The main character, who is the little sister that "Santa" delivers to Haruma. She is a sweet and very innocent girl who appears to be about 10 years younger than Haruma, making her anywhere from 10–13. As the series begins all of her knowledge of the world is derived from an instruction manual that she was given before her delivery to Haruma's home. The manual does not cover all situations and was not really written for someone of Choko's level of experience as some of the information is quite inappropriate for someone of her age. Choko is very fond of her new "onii-chan" (an affectionate term for an older brother), as she immediately calls Haruma. She is always trying to be number one in his affections but, over time, learns that she can not be her brother's favorite in all situations. She is accepting of Chitose as her brother's girlfriend and later, his wife, after she comes to this realization.
No mention is ever made of how Haruma explains or is going to explain the appearance of a younger sister to his parents.

 
 
 A young man who is going to university. When he was a child his mother miscarried and had to have a hysterectomy to save her life. He prayed to God that his mother would recover and made a wish to Santa that he would "stand in" for his mother and deliver him a little sister. Now, years later, his wish has been granted, leaving Haruma with a sudden addition to his meager household. He comes to care a great deal for his new sister and considers her to be extremely cute. He, himself, has a crush on Ayano Sonozaki, the owner of the local flower shop, but is heartbroken after she decides to return to her former love. In the manga he has a cousin named Konatsu who has a crush on him but gives up on him after learning that Chitose loves him. After Chitose goes to an omiai, a meeting between unmarried individuals, at her aunt's insistence, he realizes how much he cares for her and confesses his feelings for her. The anime never explicitly reveals whether they remain together but at the end of the manga Choko tells a new tenant that she is onii-chan and onee-chan's little sister, from which one can conclude that Haruma and Chitose are married.

 
 
 The granddaughter of the original landlady. She is a nice, but somewhat shy and accident-prone young woman who has no sense of direction. She also has feelings of insecurity due to having to wear glasses and is discontent with her appearance; she suffered a painful episode in school when she overheard the boy she liked calling her "an ugly girl with glasses". Several characters remark upon the impressive size of her bust. She develops a crush on Haruma after he says that her glasses suit her very well. In the end of manga, she is presumed to have married Haruma.

 
 
 A young woman who lives in Tsubaki manor, the same building where Haruma, Choko and Yasuoka live. She sports orange hair, enjoys liquor, teases Haruma with her (lack of) wardrobe and claims that he is interested in her body. Despite her penchant for inebriation, her laziness, her tendency to mooch any and all kinds of food off of her neighbors, her "adult" sense of humor and a somewhat scheming, manipulative nature, she seems to have a good character. She came to the original landlady's rescue after the latter took a spill down a staircase, spraining her ankle and waist. She has displayed a rather uncomfortable and intrusive interest in Chitose's bust. She is actually a gravure model and her professional name is Otokami Arisa (her real name backwards), but she keeps this knowledge from her neighbors.

 
 
 Haruma's neighbor in Tsubaki manor, a middle-aged man whose existence Haruma had forgotten about until they meet at a local shrine on the New Year's Day after Choko's appearance. Yasuoka is unemployed and appears to be struggling to find a new job after having lost his wife and daughter about a year before the present. In the manga, he eventually finds a job and everybody in the manor celebrates his good fortune.

 
 
 A woman who runs Ciel blue de fleur, a flower shop near Tsubuki manor (the literal French translation is "sky blue of flower" (although 'bleu' is misspelled). Given the poor grammar, it is uncertain exactly what the name is intended to mean; 'blue flowers the colour of the sky' or 'sky, the colour of blue flowers' are both valid interpretations, but 'sky-blue flower' is probably most likely). Ayano's dream has always been to open her own flower shop. Haruma has a crush on her, but has so far been unable to work up the nerve to do anything about it. She remains oblivious to Haruma's affections and sees him as no more than a good acquaintance. She was engaged to Kazuya until he broke it off, to her considerable distress. Haruma gives her advice which allows her to rekindle her relationship with Kazuya and they eventually marry, which leaves Haruma heartbroken.

 
 
 A young boy around Choko's age, who is somewhat shy. He unintentionally saves Choko from a nasty fall and soon develops a strong crush on her. He works at his family's public bath and lives on the premises with three older sisters.

 
 
 A young girl who appears to be around Choko's age or a little younger. She is from a rich family and lives alone in a big house with only a maid who tends to her since her father is often away on business. She is forced to take on many activities typically associated with the upper classes including: ballet, violin lessons, home schooling with a tutor, and conversational English lessons, all of which she dislikes. She meets Choko while playing hooky from her lessons. Even though she does not really like Choko at first, she comes to care for Choko as they get to know each other better. However, Yurika is unsure of how to show her feelings and often denies her affection for Choko. She initially objects to Choko's nickname for her, "Yuri-pyon", but eventually gets used to it. She has a crush on Kakeru but he is oblivious to her feelings. In the manga, it is revealed that her mother died after being hit by a car just before Christmas. She was on her way to buy a music box that Yurika wanted to give to her father as a present. Understandably, this caused her to hate Christmas, since if the holiday didn't exist, her mother wouldn't have died while shopping for a present.

 
 
 A young woman who is Haruma's "senpai" (upperclassman) both at school and in the club he belongs to. Tamami gives the impression of being quite free-spirited. She helps Haruma and other fellow students find part-time jobs (often on short notice) but Haruma is not fond of them as they tend to be "too busy" or not pay as much as he would like.

 
 The original manager of Tsubaki manor, where Haruma, Choko, Yasuoka, and Makoto all live. She has no other name and is a kind-faced widow who is getting on in years and seems quite easy-going. She decides to retire from her duties in the building after her accident and goes live with her son and daughter-in-law, stating that the accident has shown her that she is getting too old for it. She gives over her duties to her granddaughter. She is the person who inspired Choko to start a pictorial diary.

 
 
 The man who was previously engaged to Ayano and used to hold a position as illustrator with a magazine. He was forced to return to the country to take over the family inn because his father died and there were no other heirs. He decided to cancel his engagement to Ayano because he didn't want to spoil her dream of owning a flower shop by asking her to come with him. This caused Ayano considerable heartache. Eventually he reconsiders and the two of them marry and look after the inn together.

 
 
 Claiming to be Santa Claus, she is a rather tough-looking woman who rides a flying motorbike with reindeer antler-style handlebars and who does not have much time for chitchat or objections. She makes Haruma sign for the big bundle of joy she brought him, wrapped up in a bag with a ribbon, then flies off, stating that he should present any and all complaints to God. She also makes a reappearance, in Haruma's nightmare where she comes to reclaim Choko and hands Haruma some gift certificates in exchange. In the final episode her real face is revealed before she goes off handing out Christmas presents on Christmas Eve.

 
 
 A mature woman whom Choko first encounters in the public bath where Kakeru lives and works. She is a woman of firm convictions about the proper way to behave in a public bath, among other things. Although she has a similar appearance to "Santa" they are not the same person. In the manga it is Kakeru's grandmother who taught her about bath etiquette.

Media

Manga
Chocotto Sister was published by Hakusensha in the seinen magazine Young Animal and has been collected in 8 tankōbon volumes.

Anime

Chocotto Sister was produced by Nomad, directed by Yasuhiro Kuroda, and written by original creator Gō Zappa, with music by Masara Nishida and character designs by Yukihiro Kitano. The opening theme is "Doki! Doki! My Sister Soul" by Harenchi Punch and the ending theme is "Neko-nyan Dance" by Harenchi Punch. It was broadcast in 24 episodes from 12 July 2006 and 20 December 2006 on Kids Station. It was later released on eight DVDs.

Drama CDs
Four drama CDs have been produced.

References

 Yuuki, Masahiro and Aikawa, Akira. "Harenchi☆Punch's new 'Doki Doki! My Sister Soul' is the opening to Chocotto Sister". (November 2006) Newtype USA. p. 118.

External links
 ちょこッとSister official site 
 

Hakusensha franchises
Hakusensha manga
Nomad (company)
Seinen manga